Golpo Holeo Shotti (English: A story, but true) is an Indian Bengali-language horror film directed by Birsa Dasgupta, produced by Shree Venkatesh Films, starring Soham Chakraborty and Mimi Chakraborty. It is a remake of the 2012 Tamil film Pizza. The film's music is by Indraadip Das Gupta.

Plot
Rudra is a pizza delivery boy who lives with his girlfriend Anu. She is an aspiring novelist and is researching for writing a horror story, whereas Rudra does not believe in supernatural powers, and fears anything supernatural. Anu, keeps telling him that he would soon realize the presence of supernatural beings. At first, Rudra is confused and scared, and his fears are confirmed when he discovers his boss, i.e., the Pizza restaurant owner Ratul's daughter is possessed by a spirit named Mrinalini. He is further scared when the possessed girl glares at Rudra when asked by a priest if she wants to take revenge on somebody. Meanwhile, Anu becomes pregnant, and after a brief altercation, Rudra and Anu secretly marry. One day, Rudra goes out to deliver a pizza to a customer and returns to the restaurant in a state of shock while covered in blood; he is apparently injured, keeps constantly muttering Anu's name, and seems to be worried about her. When his boss questions him, Rudra explains that went to deliver a pizza to a customer named Smitha in a bungalow and recounts the events that happened at the bungalow.

Smitha requests Rudra to wait downstairs while she goes upstairs to retrieve change. Almost immediately, there is a  power failure, which alarms Rudra. While waiting downstairs completely alone in the dark for a long time and not getting any reply after calling out, he goes upstairs to investigate and finds Smitha nailed to the wall and murdered suspiciously. After looking around with a torch, he notices one slice of the pizza he delivered is missing, suggesting that there may be somebody else in the house. Horrified, Rudra makes a dash for the door only to realize that it has been locked from inside. Further more when the murdered woman's husband Bobby arrives, he at first believes his wife is running an affair and calls her. Rudra receives the call and notices that her body is missing. Through Smitha's cellphone Rudra communicates with Bobby and explains his situation thoroughly instigating Bobby to aid him on how to get out of the house. After shuffling through various drawers, he finally finds the keys but to his dismay, he is unable to unlock the door. Moreover, Bobby suddenly disappears from the front entrance followed by a gunshot, and is found by Rudra inside the house mysteriously murdered in the same room as his wife, with two slices of the pizza now missing. Also, Rudra encounters the couple's child "Mrinalini", identical to the name of the spirit allegedly possessing Ratul's daughter and finds a scribbling "Mrinalini 5-D" in her room.

Rudra tries everything he can to get out of the house including trying to break down the sealed doors and glass windows leading outside, to using the house phone which happens to work even though the line is dead. Rudra manages to contact Anu using the phone and gets her to contact to the local police to come and rescue him. When a couple of policemen arrive at the bungalow, Rudra believes that Anu had requested them to help him, but they reveal that four people had been killed in that house - Smitha, Bobby, their young daughter and a girl named Anu in the front garden, implying that she is Rudra's girl friend, Anu. The police disclose that Rudra has been missing for four days and Anu died a week ago. Besides, they also wonder how Rudra managed to enter a sealed crime scene and also show them the exact area of the room where the murders have occurred with absolutely correct and minute details. Confused and in tears, Rudra does not believe the policemen and attempts to escape the clutches of these police men in order to go in search of Anu.

While trying to escape, he witnesses the police getting dragged into the house. At this juncture, Rudra, in a horrified state, runs back to the restaurant and on the way has a fight with his friends when they spot him running and try to calm him down. While Rudra can not come to terms with the reality that Anu is dead, his friends at the restaurant and Ratul start realizing that they never saw Anu; they also observe that Rudra's home does not have any evidence that he lived with Anu. Further, it is revealed that the haunted bungalow witnessed the untimely deaths of a married couple, their daughter, and two policeman, whose ghosts Rudra interacted with. Meanwhile, Rudra seems to continue his search for Anu, has constant health issues, and seems to be disturbed by ghosts and supernatural entities.

During a delivery, when Rudra stops and calls Anu, the true story of what had happened is disclosed. The restaurant owner asks Rudra to deliver a box of candies to his house. On the way, Rudra is involved in a bike accident and come in contact with the hidden diamonds. He and Anu decide that this stealing those diamonds would improve their life style and support their baby. So, they concoct a clever story in which Rudra convincingly "forgets" the Pizza bag at the "haunted" bungalow which Ratul would never enter into, thanks to his fear of supernatural powers. Meanwhile, Anu has moved to Singapore with the diamonds and her belongings, and has obtained fake documentation using which Rudra and Anu can settle abroad.

Rudra, after the phone call, goes to deliver a pizza to a house and he encounters a series of events similar to the story he narrated. Inside, he meets a little girl identical to the "Mrinalini" he had described in his story. He is locked inside the home with "Mrinalini" glaring at him. The light then goes off.

Cast
Soham Chakraborty as Rudra
Mimi Chakraborty as Anuradha aka Anu
Rajatava Dutta as Ratul Ghosh
Saayoni Ghosh as Smitha
Kaushik Chakraborty
Arpita Mukherjee
Neel Mukherjee as Lala
Bidipta Chakraborty
Debapratim Dasgupta as Posupoti

Soundtrack

See also
 Pizza in Tamil
 Whistle in Kannada
 Pizza in Hindi

References

External links

2014 films
Indian horror thriller films
Films directed by Birsa Dasgupta
Bengali remakes of Tamil films
Indian horror film remakes
Films scored by Indradeep Dasgupta
Indian supernatural thriller films
Indian mystery thriller films
Indian supernatural horror films
2014 horror thriller films
2010s supernatural horror films
2010s mystery thriller films
Bengali-language Indian films
2010s Bengali-language films